An Enemy of the People is a 1978 American drama film directed by George Schaefer based on Arthur Miller's 1950 adaptation of Henrik Ibsen's 1882 play. The film stars Steve McQueen in the lead role of scientist Thomas Stockmann, Charles Durning as his brother Peter, and Bibi Andersson as his wife Catherine.

Plot synopsis
Thomas Stockmann (Steve McQueen) is a doctor and amateur scientist in a small, unnamed Norwegian town. The town is expecting a major boost in tourism due to the therapeutic powers of nearby springs, but Stockmann has discovered they are being polluted by waste from the town's tannery. He writes an article exposing the contamination for the local newspaper, the Messenger, but the staff is intimidated by Stockmann's brother Peter, the town mayor. Peter offers to use the springs' revenue to implement the changes his brother wants if Thomas will keep quiet, but the doctor remains uncompromising.

Thomas calls a town meeting to spread the news, but his brother and the newspaper's publishers shout him down and deride him, and he is unable to state his case. The townspeople treat the previously respected and popular Stockmann family as pariahs – his daughter  is dismissed from school and rocks are thrown through the windows of their house. Thomas' family members remain loyal to him, however, and decide against emigrating to America. Instead, they decide to stay in the town and wait for Thomas' discovery to be proved in time. As they celebrate their decision, a fresh hail of stones comes through the family home's windows.

Production
After working on The Towering Inferno, McQueen was one of the highest-earning film stars in the world. Nevertheless, he was absent from films for four years; while he received several offers during this period, he had high wage demands and insisted that his wife Ali MacGraw work with him. Among the projects that failed to materialise for the pair during this period were Deajum's Wife with producer Elliott Kastner, The Johnson County War with director Michael Winner (eventually made as Heaven's Gate by Michael Cimino) and The Betsy alongside Laurence Olivier. He also vetoed MacGraw taking part in Heaven Can Wait, and either turned down or priced himself out of roles in A Bridge Too Far and Apocalypse Now – McQueen was offered the role of Captain Willard with a $1.5 million salary, but then demanded $3 million for the smaller role of Colonel Kurtz. Bored with inactivity, but unwilling to lower his demands for mainstream work, McQueen took an unbilled role as a stunt rider in B-movie Dixie Dynamite for $175 per week.

During this period, he became interested in Miller's adaptation of Ibsen's play, seeing it as an opportunity to challenge his tough-guy, action-film persona and gain more plaudits for his acting abilities by returning to his classical acting roots. He used his own Solar Productions company for the film through First Artists, and was credited as executive producer, taking a much smaller salary himself to get the studio and distributor Warner Bros. interested.

According to an anonymous source at the time:
At first we thought it was a joke. It was as if John Barrymore, at the height of his career, had decided to play Tarzan. Everybody knows that Steve doesn't like to say a lot of lines; an Ibsen play is nothing but dialogue. We thought he was trying to force First Artists to let him out of his contract with them.
According to his then-wife Ali MacGraw:
He didn't want to do another shoot-'em-up. Steve is a combination of all the things he wants the world to think he is - macho, tough, and insensitive. But he is also the most sensitive man I know. He began to read: Chekov, Strindberg, Gogol, tons of people. An Enemy of the People touched him.
McQueen approached Schaefer to direct in May 1976. The director said, "all I knew about him was the character up there on screen riding motorcycles, but Steve is serious. There comes a point in life when you don't want to play young buckos anymore. I said the picture couldn't be designed to protect a weak performance by him. He said he absolutely agreed."

Casting
Initially, he intended for MacGraw to play the part of Catherine Stockmann, but the couple's relationship had deteriorated. In 1978, MacGraw left McQueen to work with Sam Peckinpah on Convoy, her first film since The Getaway. Instead, Swedish actress Bibi Andersson was cast for the part. Nicol Williamson was initially cast as Peter Stockmann, but pulled out, and Charles Durning was brought in as replacement.

Filming
Filming began on 30 August after a three-week rehearsal. Charles Durning later recalled, "after the first week of rehearsal, [McQueen] thought he was ready to begin shooting. He wasn't, and after the second week of rehearsal, he knew he wasn't. His performance grew tremendously during those three weeks."

The film was originally budgeted for $2.5 million but overran to $3 million. McQueen threw himself into the film, going as far as to base his own makeup on photographs from a 1902 Swedish stage production of the play, personally overseeing the construction of the sets, and adhering to the play's long climactic speech, though it went against the taciturn style that had been his trademark.

Release
The film was made in 1976 and ready to be shown early 1977.

The Warner Bros. studio was at a loss at how to promote the film. McQueen was nearly unrecognisable, performing the role with a beard and long hair. The wordy period film was not what was expected from an established action star, and the film only had a very limited theatrical release. For a year after it was completed An Enemy of the People sat on the shelf before it was given a tentative release in college towns in March 1978; it performed poorly and was quickly withdrawn. The poster issued to promote the film surrounded the image of McQueen, as Stockmann, with artwork of his better known previous roles, including 'Doc' McCoy from The Getaway, Jake Holman from The Sand Pebbles, and Frank Bullitt from Bullitt; a lobbycard was also issued featuring no images from the film, but instead used positive reviews from test screenings. McQueen promoted the movie with an hour lecture at UCLA titled "The Genius of Ibsen", but the slated October 1978 national release was cancelled.

On June 11, 1980, however, the film had an accidental premiere at two drive-in movie theaters owned by the Essaness chain: the Hammond Twin drive-in in Hammond, Indiana, and the I-80 drive-in in Tinley Park, Illinois, at 10:45 PM Central Daylight Time, preceding the Clint Eastwood comedy Bronco Billy. A Chicago-area representative for Warner Bros. lamented the situation, stating: 

McQueen moved back to more familiar territory for his next (and, ultimately, final) two films, the Western Tom Horn and action movie The Hunter.

Even after its short cinema run, the film remained highly obscure, not being released on home media until 2009, when Warner Bros. issued it on DVD through its burn-to-demand digital distribution arm.

Cast
Steve McQueen as Thomas Stockmann
Charles Durning as Peter Stockmann
Bibi Andersson as Catherine Stockmann
Eric Christmas as Morten Kiil
Michael Cristofer as Hovstad
Richard Dysart as Aslaksen
Michael Higgins as Billing
Richard Bradford as Capt. Forster
Ham Larsen as Morton Stockmann
John Levin as Ejlif Stockmann
Robin Pearson Rose as Petra Stockmann

References

External links
 
 
 

1978 films
1978 drama films
1970s English-language films
American drama films
American films based on plays
Films about scientists
Films based on works by Arthur Miller
Films based on works by Henrik Ibsen
Films directed by George Schaefer
Films scored by Leonard Rosenman
Films set in Norway
Films set in the 19th century
First Artists films
Warner Bros. films
1970s American films